Roger Mello (born 20 November 1965) is a Brazilian children's book illustrator. He was the first artist from Latin America to win the Hans Christian Andersen Award.

Honours and awards 
 2002 Espace-Enfants
 2002 Prêmio Jabuti
 2014 Hans Christian Andersen Award

Publications 
 (with Daniel Hahn) Charcoal Boys (Elsewhere Editions, 2019)
 (with Daniel Hahn) You can't be too careful! (Elsewhere Editions, 2017)
 (with Cao Wenxuan, tr. Chloe Garcia Roberts) Feather (Archipelago Books, 2017)
 Meninos do mangue (Companhia das Letrinhas, 2012)

References

External links
 Mello on WorldCat

1965 births
Living people
Brazilian children's book illustrators
Chen Bochui Children's Literature Award winners